Dugong Beach Lodge Airstrip  is an airport serving Dugong Beach Lodge, Inhambane Province, Mozambique.

See also
 
 
 List of airports in Mozambique

References

External links
Aeroportos de Moçambique

Airports in Mozambique
Buildings and structures in Inhambane Province